The 1911 United States House of Representatives election in New Mexico was held on November 7, 1911, in anticipation of the admission of the state of New Mexico. This election took place during the 62nd Congress; the winners were seated on January 8, 1912.

Background
New Mexico joined the Union as the 47th state on January 6, 1912.  It had been a territory since 1850, originally including Arizona and a portion of Nevada until 1863.  New Mexico Territory and Arizona Territory had long sought statehood, and during the debates over admitting Oklahoma, and early version of the Oklahoma Enabling Act included a clause providing for New Mexico Territory and Arizona Territory to be admitted as a single state, but this was later removed.  New Mexico was finally admitted as a state during the 62nd Congress, with 2 Representatives, which was subsequently reduced to 1 in the Apportionment Act of 1911, passed prior to New Mexico statehood.

General election

Candidates

Democratic Party
 Harvey Butler Fergusson, former delegate for 
 Paz Valverde

Republican Party
 Elfego Baca, gunfighter and Socorro County sheriff
 George Curry, former Governor of New Mexico Territory

Socialist Party
 C. Cutting
 J.W. Hansen

Results

See also
1911 United States House of Representatives elections
62nd United States Congress

References

1911
New Mexico
United States House of Representatives